Before These Crowded Streets is the third studio album by Dave Matthews Band, released on April 28, 1998. It was the last official album by the group to be produced by longtime producer Steve Lillywhite until 2012's Away from the World and their first album recorded at The Plant Recording Studios in Sausalito, California. The album title is taken from the lyrics of the song "The Dreaming Tree." It debuted at #1 on the Billboard 200 charts after selling 421,000 units in its first week of release knocking the Titanic soundtrack from the top spot after a run of 16 consecutive weeks at #1.

Track listing
Special guest Tim Reynolds is featured on all tracks.

Several short musical interludes appear between songs:
A clip in which LeRoi Moore is heard answering his cell phone follows "Rapunzel."
A clip of flute music follows "Don't Drink the Water."
 A string passage by the Kronos Quartet serves as a segue from "Halloween" to "The Stone."
An outtake featuring Bela Fleck and Alanis Morissette follows "The Stone."
A clip of "Doobie Thing," an early DMB instrumental song, follows "The Dreaming Tree."
A clip of "Anyone Seen the Bridge?", a live show transition song, and a short excerpt of "Deed is Done," an unreleased song from the previous tour, follows "Pig."
A clip now referred to as "The Last Stop Reprise" follows "Spoon."

Excluded songs
Songs that were recorded during the sessions, but were not included on the final cut:
"Help Myself" – Licensed for the Scream 2 soundtrack in lieu of "Halloween", which the band decided was too good to leave off the album.
"Don't Burn the Pig" – Evolved into "Pig" during the sessions.
"Get in Line"
"MacHead"
"#40 (Always)"

MacHead
"MacHead" was a song recorded during the album's sessions, but it was never completed, so did not make the album. Producer Steve Lillywhite named the song, claiming it sounded like a cross between the sound of Paul McCartney and Radiohead. The song's existence is only known from an image on the 1999 fan calendar with a list of the working titles of the other songs on this album and from an alleged meeting in which Jake Vigliotti claims to have heard said recording.

Some fans familiar with the idea of "MacHead" speculated it had been developed, renamed, and added to the band's catalog. They speculate that "MacHead" developed into "Bartender", which debuted in January 1999 at a Dave Matthews and Tim Reynolds concert just months after the April '98 release of Before These Crowded Streets. In November 2009, Jake Vigliotti claims to have heard 6 different demo takes of "Machead" from an early 1997 recording session for the album, effectively confirming its existence to the fan community.

In a 2010 interview with Cali from CBS Radio, Stefan Lessard was asked to give his thoughts on Machead. He replied that "Machead's this little number that I believe was the last song to possibly make it on Before These Crowded Streets and I think there's a recording I have of it somewhere. So it's just finding a recording of it and listening to it and that's on our homework list." As of February of 2022, no official recording has surfaced.

Personnel

Dave Matthews Band
 Carter Beauford – drums, percussion, backing vocals
 Stefan Lessard – bass guitar
 Dave Matthews – vocals, acoustic guitar
 LeRoi Moore – saxophone, penny whistle, bass clarinet
 Boyd Tinsley – acoustic violin

Additional musicians
 Tim Reynolds – electric guitar and mandolin
 The Lovely Ladies – background vocals (5)
 Tawatha Agee
 Cindy Myzell
 Brenda White-King
 John D'earth – trumpet (6)
 Béla Fleck – banjo (3, 4, 11)
 Greg Howard – Chapman Stick (9)
 Kronos Quartet – strings (6, 7)
 David Harrington – violin
 John Sherba – violin
 Hank Dutt – viola
 Joan Jeanrenaud – cello
 Alanis Morissette – guest vocals (4, 11)
 Butch Taylor – piano and organ (2, 8)

Technical
 Steve Lillywhite – producer, mixing
 Stephen Harris – engineer
 John Alagía – additional pre-production
 Joel Cortright – assistant engineer
 John Seymour – assistant engineer
 Ted Jensen – mastering
 John D'earth – orchestral arrangements (6, 7)
 Thane Kerner – art direction, design
 Ellen von Unwerth – photography

Charts

Weekly charts

Year-end charts

Certifications

References

1998 albums
Dave Matthews Band albums
RCA Records albums
Albums produced by Steve Lillywhite
Albums recorded at Electric Lady Studios